The 1989 Samoa rugby union tour of Europe was a series of matches played between September and November 1989 in Europe by Samoa national rugby union team. The visit Germany, Belgium., Romania, France and England.

Results

References
 

1989 rugby union tours
1989 in Samoan rugby union
1989
1989–90 in European rugby union
1989–90 in French rugby union
1989–90 in English rugby union
1989
1989
1989
1989